Language localisation (or language localization) is the process of adapting a product's translation to a specific country or region. It is the second phase of a larger process of product translation and cultural adaptation (for specific countries, regions, cultures or groups) to account for differences in distinct markets, a process known as internationalisation and localisation.

Language localisation differs from translation activity because it involves a comprehensive study of the target culture in order to correctly adapt the product to local needs. Localisation can be referred to by the numeronym L10N (as in: "L", followed by the number 10, and then "N").

The localisation process is most generally related to the cultural adaptation and translation of software, video games, websites, and technical communication, as well as audio/voiceover, video, or other multimedia content, and less frequently to any written translation (which may also involve cultural adaptation processes). Localisation can be done for regions or countries where people speak different languages or where the same language is spoken. For instance, different dialects of German, with different idioms, are spoken in Germany, Austria, Switzerland, and Belgium.

The overall process: internationalisation, globalisation, and localisation 
The former Localization Industry Standards Association (LISA) said that globalisation "can best be thought of as a cycle rather than a single process". To globalise is to plan the design and development methods for a product in advance, keeping in mind a multicultural audience, in order to avoid increased costs and quality problems, save time, and smooth the localising effort for each region or country.

There are two primary technical processes that comprise globalisation: internationalisation and localisation.

The first phase, internationalisation, encompasses the planning and preparation stages for a product built to support global markets. This process removes all cultural assumptions, and country- or language-specific content is stored so that it can be easily adapted. If this content is not separated during this phase, it must be fixed during localisation, adding time and expense to the project. In extreme cases, products that are not internationalised may not be localisable. Internationalization is often written as 'i18n' in the localization industry, where the number 18 is the number of letters between i and n in the English word.

The second phase, localisation, refers to the actual adaptation of the product for a specific market. The localisation phase involves, among other things, the four issues LISA describes as linguistic, physical, business and cultural, and technical issues. Localization is sometimes written as 'l10n', where the number 10 refers to the number of letters between l and n.

At the end of each phase, testing (including quality assurance) is performed to ensure that the product works properly and meets the client's quality expectations.

Translation versus localisation 

Though it is sometimes difficult to draw the limits between translation and localisation, in general localisation addresses significant, non-textual components of products or services. In addition to translation (and, therefore, grammar and spelling issues that vary from place to place where the same language is spoken), the localisation process might include adapting graphics; adopting local currencies; using proper format for date and time, addresses, and phone numbers applicable to the location; the choices of colours; cultural references; and many other details, including rethinking the physical structure of a product. All these changes aim to recognise local sensitivities; avoid conflict with local culture, customs, and common habits; and enter the local market by merging into its needs and desires. For example, localisation aims to offer country-specific websites of the same company or different editions of a book depending on where it is published. It must be kept in mind that a political entity such as a country is not the same as a language or culture; even in countries where there exists a substantially identical relationship between a language and a political entity, there are almost certainly multiple cultures and multiple minority languages even if the minority languages are spoken by transient populations. For instance, Japan's national language is Japanese and is the primary language for over 99% of the population, but the country also recognises 11 languages officially; others are spoken by transient populations, and others yet are spoken as second or other languages.

Globalisation versus localisation 

Whereas localisation is the process of adapting one product to a particular locale, globalisation designs the product to minimise the extra work required for each localisation.

Suppose that a company operating exclusively in Germany chooses to open a major office in Russia and needs a Russian-language website. The company offers the same products and services in both countries with minor differences, but perhaps some elements that appeared in the original website intended for a German audience are offensive or upsetting in Russia (use of flags, colours, nationalistic images, songs, etc.). Thus, that company might lose a potential market because of small details of presentation.

Furthermore, this company might need to adapt the product to its new buyers; video games are the best example.

Now, suppose instead that this company has major offices in a dozen countries and needs a specifically designed website in each of these countries. Before deciding how to localise the website and the products offered in any given country, a professional in the area might advise the company to create an overall strategy: to globalise the way the organisation does business. The company might want to design a framework to codify and support this global strategy. The globalisation strategy and the globalisation framework would provide uniform guidance for the twelve separate localisation efforts.

Globalisation is especially important in mitigating extra work involved in the long-term cycle of localisation. Because localisation is usually a cycle and not a one-time project, there are new texts, updates, and projects to localise. For example, as the original website is updated over time, each already translated and localised website must be updated. This work cycle is continuous as long as the original project continues to evolve. A streamlined globalisation processes is therefore important for ongoing changes.

Localisation technology 
The use of technology has developed into an important aspect of translation and localization. The industry now holds a strong preference for the use of technology in the translation, editing, and proofreading process as it provides major benefits in project management workflow automation, terminology consistency, quality assurance. The most commonly used language technologies include:

 Translation Management Systems (TMS)
 Computer Aided/Assisted Translation (CAT)
 Machine Translation (MT)
 Translation Memory (TM)
 Content Management Systems (CMS) with APIs

A Translation Management System (TMS) is a software program that supports the organization and facilitation of translation and localisation projects. A localisation project usually involves multiple individuals often located in different locales, this makes the TMS a necessary tool in piecing together everyone’s efforts. The TMS provides organization and automation to the project management workflow, collects project data, generates reports, and integrates necessary elements such as machine translation (MT), translation memory (TM), and sometimes provides access to quality assurance tools. 

In essence, the TMS provides a workbench for all the necessary tools involved in a successful translation and localization operation.

Language tags and codes 

Language codes are closely related to the localising process because they indicate the locales involved in the translation and adaptation of the product. They are used in various contexts; for example, they might be informally used in a document published by the European Union or they might be introduced in HTML element under the  attribute. In the case of the European Union style guide, the language codes are based on the ISO 639-1 alpha-2 code; in HTML, the language tags are generally defined within the Internet Engineering Task Force's Best Current Practice (BCP) 47. The decision to use one type of code or tag versus another depends upon the nature of the project and any requirements set out for the localisation specialist.

Most frequently, there is a primary sub-code that identifies the language (e.g., "en"), and an optional sub-code in capital letters that specifies the national variety (e.g., "GB" or "US" according to ISO 3166-1 alpha-2). The sub-codes are typically linked with a hyphen, though in some contexts it's necessary to substitute this with an underscore.

There are multiple language tag systems available for language codification. For example, the International Organization for Standardization (ISO) specifies both two- and three-letter codes to represent languages in standards ISO 639-1 and ISO 639-2, respectively.

Notes

See also 

 Internationalisation and localisation
 Globalisation
 American and British English differences
 Spanish dialects and varieties
 Transcreation
 Variety (linguistics)
 Indigenisation

References

Business terms
Globalization
Internationalization and localization
Translation
Transliteration
Word coinage